Flabellinidae is a taxonomic family of brightly coloured sea slugs, specifically nudibranchs, marine gastropod mollusks.

This family has no subfamilies.

Genera and species
Genera within the family Flabellinidae include:
 Calmella Eliot, 1910
 Carronella Korshunova, Martynov, Bakken, Evertsen, Fletcher, Mudianta, Saito, Lundin, Schrödl & Picton, 2017
 Coryphellina O'Donoghue, 1929
 Edmundsella Korshunova, Martynov, Bakken, Evertsen, Fletcher, Mudianta, Saito, Lundin, Schrödl & Picton, 2017
 Flabellina Gray, 1833
 Paraflabellina Korshunova, Martynov, Bakken, Evertsen, Fletcher, Mudianta, Saito, Lundin, Schrödl & Picton, 2017

References

 
Gastropod families